Anime Expo, abbreviated AX, is an American anime convention held in Los Angeles, California and organized by the non-profit Society for the Promotion of Japanese Animation (SPJA). The convention is traditionally held annually on the first weekend of July, spanning the course of four days. Anime Expo is regularly hosted at the Los Angeles Convention Center but has also been held in other cities such as Anaheim, San Jose, New York, and Tokyo. Anime Expo is currently the largest North American anime convention as of 2017. The 2020 and 2021 conventions took place online due to the COVID-19 pandemic. Anime Expo returned to its in-person format in 2022 despite the COVID-19 pandemic. The most recent convention took place between July 1 and July 4, 2022, as an in-person event for the first time since the one held in 2019.

Events and programming 

Anime Expo features many events and activities during the convention for attendees to take part in such as guest panels, tabletop gaming, competitions, an arcade, and concerts.

Top attractions include the Masquerade cosplay contest, Anime Music Video (AMV) competition, Battle of the Bands, and Charity Auction. Anime Expo hosts a multitude of industry Guests of Honor (GoH), including notable music artists who often hold large concerts at Anime Expo. Anime Expo holds a large variety of focus panels, workshops, and events, some of which are fan or industry-sponsored. Numerous film and video rooms also show anime screenings that run all day and night.

Much like other conventions, Anime Expo also features a large-scale exhibit hall where attendees can purchase a variety of products from a wide range of exhibitors. This exhibit hall also features an artist alley where attendees can purchase fan-created artwork, as well as other varieties of crafts such as wigs, pins, and cosplay material.

Convention history

History

The first Anime Expo was held from July 3–6, 1992 at the Red Lion Hotel in San Jose, California. Many of its original staff came from Anime Con, an anime convention held in San Jose in 1991, and later absorbed by the SPJA in 1992. In 1994, Anime Expo made a strategic relocation to the Southern California area and all subsequent conventions have taken place there since.

The convention continues to thrive due to the growing popularity of anime and Japanese popular culture and maintains a strong draw due to the many notable Japanese guests it hosts. It currently holds the title of North America's largest anime convention, a title which it has consistently held every year except in 2003, in which its attendance was slightly edged out by the east coast anime convention Otakon. From 1,750 attendees in 1992, Anime Expo's size has increased to over 107,658 in 2017, making Anime Expo the largest anime and manga convention in North America.

In March 2009, Chief Executive Officer Trulee Karahashi, who had been a part of Anime Expo and SPJA in various capacities for 11 years, left the organization. In September, former Universal Studios executive Michael Lattanzio was later hired as the SPJA's new CEO.

In January 2010, eight members of Anime Expo's upper management team (ConCom) publicly resigned because of disagreements over the organization's new direction set forth by Lattanzio. One significant point of contention was Lattanzio's decision to refocus and restructure the SPJA's marketing efforts, starting with the dismissal of a PR and marketing contractor that the organization had a close working relationship with since 2004. Additionally, two other personnel had already left for other reasons, leaving only the vice-chair and two others as returning members of the previous year's team.

In September 2010, Lattanzio was released from his CEO position. Then SPJA Chairman of the Board Marc Perez became acting CEO; In August 2011 he stepped down from the Board of Directors to take over as a full-time CEO (as required by the SPJA bylaws).

In early 2012, Anime News Network reported that Anime Expo suffered a $1.2 million loss in 2010. The 2011 convention saw a $100,000 profit and reduced the outstanding debt to $700,000. The article also stated that one of the creditors, IDG World Expo, will be taking over several aspects of the organization, with guest selection and programming remaining under SPJA control. Additionally, Takayuki Karahashi has been elected as Chairman of the Board of Directors.

The convention continued to be located at the LACC through 2019. In April 2016, Marc Perez left the company, with Ray Chiang becoming acting CEO of SPJA.

On June 30, 2017, the first Pre-Show Night was added to the Anime Expo, which included the Neon District, hosting the World Cosplay Summit U.S. Finals, and premieres.

As the convention's attendance has grown, it's seen long lines for entry into the convention hall, which organizers said was due to safety and security concerns.

In the months leading to the 2020 event, a global coronavirus outbreak created concerns related to large gatherings, such as Anime Expo. On April 17, 2020, the SPJA announced that it was cancelling Anime Expo 2020, citing "health and safety" concerns. However, the SPJA stated it still planned to hold the 2021 event on its normal July dates. On May 27, 2020, they announced a two-day online convention, titled Anime Expo Lite, which took place on July 3 and 4, 2020. On March 3, 2021, the SPJA canceled the 2021 live convention, and announced that the Anime Expo Lite would instead be held on the 2021 schedule, citing "continued uncertainties surrounding the COVID-19 pandemic." Despite the COVID-19 pandemic, Anime Expo returned in-person in 2022; Anime Expo 2022 began on July 1 and ended on July 4 as an in-person event for the first time since 2019.

Convention locations

Other Anime Expos
The SPJA twice ran conventions outside California: Anime Expo New York in 2002, and Anime Expo Tokyo in 2004.

Anime Expo New York
Anime Expo New York (AXNY) was held in 2002 in the Times Square district of New York City, New York. The event was originally a joint effort with Central Park Media and its industry event, Big Apple Anime Fest (BAAF). Due to differences, the event ran as separate entities within the same time frame and venues, with BAAF hosting the theatrical film screenings, and Anime Expo New York hosting the convention. The events shared some resources, with notable guests listed in the program guides of both events.
The SPJA ran the event in order to demonstrate that it could run events outside its home state of California. The event was a precursor to Anime Expo Tokyo which ran in Tokyo, Japan in 2004.
The SPJA has not run any events outside California since 2004.

Convention locations

Anime Expo Tokyo

Anime Expo Tokyo (AX Tokyo) was held in 2004 at the Sunshine City Convention Center in Ikebukuro, Tokyo, Japan. It was not technically organized directly by the SPJA, but rather was organized by the Japanese Association for Science Fiction International Communication (www.jasfic.or.jp)(JASFIC) with assistance from the SPJA. JASFIC had two goals for Anime Expo Tokyo. The first goal was to establish in Japan a non-corporate-sponsored convention dedicated to anime. The second goal was to demonstrate to the organizers of the World Science Fiction Convention (WorldCon) that Japan could serve as a suitable venue for conventions that attract foreigners. Although Anime Expo Tokyo did not go on to a second year, JASFIC was ultimately successful in attracting the 65th World Science Fiction Convention to Japan in 2007.

Anime Expo Tokyo had a list of over 40 guests such as manga artist Ken Akamatsu, MiQ, Under17, Hiroshi Aro, and many others, although a small handful had to make last-minute cancellations. Anime Expo Tokyo was also the very first Anime Expo that officially hosted guests from the U.S. anime industry such as webcomic artist Fred Gallagher and voice actor Crispin Freeman.

Of Anime Expo Tokyo's 4,249 attendees, approximately 300 of that number were estimated to have traveled from abroad. In addition to the attendance numbers were 240 members of the press, 40 of which were from overseas. An additional 430 people were composed of dealers, guests, or staff.

No plans to host another official Anime Expo outside California have been announced.

Convention locations

Anime Expo Ontario
Anime Expo Ontario was held in November 2022.

Convention locations

Other conventions

Anime Conji

In 2010, Anime Conji began as an annual anime convention in San Diego. In 2013, it began to be run by SPJA. Anime Conji 2016 was cancelled due to event quality concerns. Anime Conji 2017 was also cancelled. The convention returned in 2018 under its original organizers, the San Diego Speculative Fiction Society (SanSFiS). In 2020, due to the COVID-19 pandemic, Anime Conji was suspended indefinitely.

Organizational structure
The Society for the Promotion of Japanese Animation (SPJA), the parent organization which produces Anime Expo, is a federal and California state registered 501(c)(3) non-profit charitable organization. Before January 1, 2020, they were registered as a 501(c)(6) non-profit trade benefit organization.

The operation of the Anime Expo is divided into two groups: Entertainment & Operations. Entertainment has the following divisions: AV Tech, Entertainment Hall, Guest Relations, Interactive Events and Programming. Operations have the following divisions: Exhibit Hall & Registration and Facilities. As of 2013, the SPJA employed 11 employees and over 1,000 volunteers for Anime Expo.

Anime Expo's parent company, the SPJA, has several additional paid positions whose roles are to conduct the organization's year-round operations. 
Such positions also include the: Administration Director, Chief Executive Officer, Finance Manager, HR Director, Marketing Director, and Technology Director. 
The SPJA also hires consultants for outsourced functions such as: Marketing consultation, Governance & Strategic training, Legal Representation, Vending, and other matters on an as-needed basis.

Notes
 The 2009 event donated over $29,000 to the Children's Hospital of Orange County (CHOC) from the SPJA Charity Auction, announced during closing ceremonies on Sunday, July 5, 2009
 Masquerade main event was attended by a standing-room-only crowd with over 7,200 seats available.
 Total 2010 through-the-doors attendance achieved 105,000 (turnstile), compared to 2009's attendance of 109,000 (turnstile). This was Anime Expo's second attendance decline since its inception.
 Anime Expo's 20th Anniversary was celebrated in 2011.
 July 4, 2011 – Nearly $30,000 were raised at the SPJA Charity Auction for the Japanese Red Cross Society to aid in disaster relief.

References

External links

 

Recurring events established in 1992
Anime conventions in the United States
Culture of Anaheim, California
Culture of Los Angeles
1992 establishments in California
Conventions in Los Angeles